Clara Thue Ebbell (22 February 1880 – 1971) was a Norwegian author.

She was born in Grimstad. She is known for her works of young adult fiction; titles include Hun som skrev Onkel Toms hytte (1916), Da Mayflower drog (1920), Fire på egen hånd (1935, 1959), Maja (1960) and I ungdomsbyen med Henrik Ibsen (1966). She also biographed Katharina von Bora (1917), Catherine Booth (1929) and Cathinka Guldberg (1940), and took part in feminist work.

She was married to Bendix Joachim Ebbell. She was eleven years his junior, and outlived him by 34 years.

References

Norwegian women novelists
Norwegian feminists
1880 births
1971 deaths
Norwegian writers of young adult literature
Women writers of young adult literature
Norwegian biographers
Women biographers
People from Grimstad
20th-century Norwegian novelists
20th-century Norwegian women writers